Hurricane Iniki (Hawaiian: iniki meaning "strong and piercing wind") was the most powerful hurricane to strike Hawaii in recorded history. Forming on September 5, 1992, during the strong 1990–1995 El Niño, Iniki was one of eleven Central Pacific tropical cyclones during that season. It attained tropical storm status on September 8 and further intensified into a hurricane the next day. After turning north, Iniki struck the island of Kauai on September 11 at peak intensity; it had winds of 145 mph and reached Category 4 status on the Saffir–Simpson hurricane scale. It was the first hurricane to hit the state since Hurricane Iwa in the 1982 season, and is the only known major hurricane to hit the state. Iniki dissipated on September 13 about halfway between Hawaii and Alaska.

Iniki caused around $3.1 billion (equivalent to $ billion in ) in damage and six deaths, making it the costliest natural disaster on record in the state. At the time, Iniki was the third-costliest United States hurricane. The storm struck just 18 days after Hurricane Andrew, the costliest tropical cyclone ever at the time, struck Florida.

The Central Pacific Hurricane Center (CPHC) failed to issue tropical cyclone warnings and watches 24 hours in advance. Despite the lack of early warning, only six deaths ensued. Damage was greatest on Kauai, where the hurricane destroyed more than 1,400 houses and severely damaged more than 5,000. Though not directly in the path of the eye, Oahu experienced moderate damage from wind and storm surge.

Meteorological history

The origin of Iniki is unclear, but it possibly began as a tropical wave that exited the west African coast on August 18. It moved westward across northern South America and later Central America, centering the eastern Pacific Ocean on August 28. Upon its formation, the depression had a ragged area of convection, and the National Hurricane Center anticipated minimal strengthening over the subsequent few days. This was due to the convective structure having poorly-defined outflow, or ventilation. Warm sea surface temperatures, 2–5° F (1–3° C) above normal, were considered a positive factor. On September 6, the depression crossed 140° W, entering the area of warning responsibility of the Central Pacific Hurricane Center (CPHC). On that day, the CPHC anticipated that the depression would dissipate within 24 hours, and the agency ceased issuing advisories; however, the depression reorganized on the next day, and warnings were re-issued. Steered by a subtropical ridge to the north, the depression continued westward, or slightly south of due west. On September 8, the CPHC upgraded the depression to tropical storm status, giving it the name Iniki, which is Hawaiian for a sharp and piercing wind.

Iniki gradually intensified as its track shifted to the north. The storm moved around the western edge of the subtropical ridge, which was weakening due to an upper-level trough that was moving eastward from the International Date Line. Typically, the subtropical ridge keeps storms away from the Hawaiian islands. The hurricane slowed and curved toward the north while continuing to intensify. The approaching trough caused Iniki to accelerate to the north-northeast toward the western Hawaiian islands.

Iniki moved rapidly across the island, and about 40 minutes after landfall, the hurricane re-emerged into the Pacific Ocean as it accelerated away from the state. The hurricane thereafter weakened, dropping to tropical storm status by September 13. That day, Iniki transitioned into an extratropical cyclone as it became integrated with an approaching cold front, while located about halfway between Hawaii and Alaska.

Preparations
While Iniki was in its development stages, various tropical cyclone forecast models anticipated a range of possibilities for the hurricane's future trajectory, ranging from a landfall on the Big Island to a path to the west, away from the state. The hurricane initially followed a trajectory similar to other storms in the region, passing south of the state. The CPHC relied on the Miami-based National Hurricane Center for the models, and lacked a detailed analysis on each model run, which caused errors in forecasting. The agency also had limited satellite imagery and direct observations to track the hurricane. As such, the CPHC failed to issue tropical cyclone warnings and watches for the hurricane well in advance, although the agency warned for the potential of high surf. For several days prior to the disaster, the CPHC and the news media forecast Iniki to remain well south of the island chain.

Two days before the storm struck, the Naval Western Oceanography Center on Oahu recommended that the United States Navy fleet at the Pearl Harbor Shipyard to start storm preparations. A few Naval facilities were evacuated, some ahead of official hurricane warnings from the CPHC. Early on September 11, less than 24 hours before Iniki made landfall, the CPHC issued a hurricane watch for Kauai, Niihau, and the northwestern Hawaiian islands to the French Frigate Shoals. A few hours later, the agency upgraded the watch to a hurricane warning for Kauai and Niihau. A hurricane warning was later issued for Oahu, while a tropical storm watch was issued for the islands of Maui County. Warning sirens blared on Kauai and Oʻahu to warn the public of the approaching storm. The hurricane warning for Kauai was downgraded to a tropical storm warning after Iniki departed the island, causing some confusion whether there was another storm approaching the area. Reports about the storm were disseminated by radio, newspapers, and news stations. After the hurricane warnings were issued, TV stations began 24 hour coverage dedicated to the storm. Residents responded well to the hurricane, in part due to the scenes of destruction from Hurricane Andrew in south Florida just three weeks prior. Iniki nearly struck the Central Pacific Hurricane Center in Honolulu. Had it hit there, Iniki, along with Hurricane Andrew and Typhoon Omar, would have struck each of the three National Weather Service offices responsible for tropical cyclone warnings within a two-month period.

In response to the approaching hurricane, about 38,000 people evacuated to public shelters, including 8,000 on Kauai and 30,000 people in Oahu. On Kauai, schools were canceled, and the traffic was light during the evacuation, with streets clear by mid-morning. Rather than sending tourists to public shelters, two major hotels kept their occupants in the buildings during Iniki's passage of Kauai. Some residents rode out the hurricane in their homes. According to a post-storm survey, there was no one on the island who did not hear about the impending storm. On Oʻahu, all schools, and most businesses, were closed during the storm's passage. Only critical government employees worked during the storm. Officials opened 110 public shelters on Oʻahu, including some schools meant for refuge only; this meant that they did not provide food, cots, blankets, medications or other comfort items. Roughly one-third of Oahu's population participated in the evacuation, though many others went to the house of a family member or friend for shelter. Officials assessed that the execution of the evacuations went well, beginning with the vulnerable coastal area. For those in need, vans and buses gave emergency transportation, while police manned certain overused intersections. The two main problems that occurred during the evacuation were lack of parking at shelters and exit routes for the coastlines. On the Big Island, officials ordered for residents within  of the coastline to evacuate to higher ground.

Impact

Hurricane Iniki was the costliest hurricane to strike the state of Hawaii, causing $3.1 billion in damage. That made it the third-costliest United States hurricane at the time, behind Hurricane Hugo in 1989 and Hurricane Andrew in August 1992, one month prior to Iniki. It was the first significant hurricane to threaten the state since Hurricane Iwa ten years prior. Iniki affected all of Hawaii with high waves and strong winds, with the worst impacts on the island of Kauai. Seven people died during the hurricane – three on Kauai, three offshore, and one on Oahu. The low death toll was likely due to well-executed warnings and preparation. Of the offshore deaths, two were Japanese nationals who died when their boat capsized south of Kauai. There were also around 100 storm-related injuries throughout the state, some of which occurred during the hurricane's aftermath.

Kauai 
Hurricane Iniki made landfall on the south-central portion of Kauai, and moved across the island in 40 minutes. Based on the island's damage patterns, meteorologist Ted Fujita estimated there were as many as 26 microbursts, which are sudden downdrafts of wind capable of reaching . There were also two mini-swirls, which are small localized swirls within the eyewall. In general, the winds descending the island's mountains were more damaging than the upslope winds. In addition to its strong winds, Iniki lashed the southern Kauai coastline with a  storm surge, or rise in water. Because it moved quickly through the island, there were no reports of significant rainfall.

Iniki's passage left extensive damage throughout Kauai, with 14,350 homes damaged to some degree. Only the western portion of the island escaped the severe damage. Three people died on the island – one due to flying debris, one to a collapsed house, and one due to a heart attack. Across Kauai, Iniki destroyed 1,421 houses, including 63 that were lost from the high waves and water. The hurricane also severely damaged 5,152 homes, while 7,178 received minor damage, which left more than 7,000 people homeless. High waters damaged several hotels and condominiums along the island's southern shore. A few were restored quickly, though some took several years to be rebuilt. One hotel—the Coco Palms Resort famous for Elvis Presley's Blue Hawaii—never reopened after the hurricane.

Hurricane Iniki's making landfall during daylight hours, combined with the popularity of camcorders, led many Kauai residents to record much of the damage as it was occurring. The footage was later used to create an hour-long video documentary. Commercial air service was suspended.

Iniki's high winds also downed 26.5% of the island's transmission poles, 37% of its distribution poles, and 35% of its  distribution wire system. The entire island lacked electricity and television service for an extended period of time. Electric companies restored only 20% of the island's power service within four weeks of Iniki, while other areas were without power for up to three to four months. Also affected by the storm was the agricultural sector. Though much of the sugar cane was already harvested, what was left was severely damaged. The winds destroyed tender tropical plants like bananas and papayas and uprooted or damaged fruit and nut trees.

The high winds stripped much of Kauai from its vegetation, wrecking sugar cane fields, as well as fruit and nut trees.

Among those on Kauai was filmmaker Steven Spielberg, who was preparing for the final day of on-location shooting of the film Jurassic Park. He and the 130 of his cast and crew remained safely in a hotel during Iniki's passage. According to Spielberg, "every single structure was in shambles; roofs and walls were torn away; telephone poles and trees were down as far as the eye could see." Spielberg included footage of Iniki battering the Kaua'i coastal walls as part of the completed film, where a tropical storm makes up a pivotal part of the plot. Members of the film's crew helped to clear some of the debris off of nearby roads.

Elsewhere 
The outer rainbands of the hurricane spawned an F1 tornado in Nānākuli, also on Oahu. Along western Oahu, Iniki produced a  surge, with  waves recorded near Mākaha. Prolonged periods of high waves severely eroded and damaged the southwestern coast of Oahu, with the areas most affected being Barbers Point through Kaena. The Waianae coastline experienced the most damage, with waves and storm surge flooding the second floor of beachside apartments. In all, Hurricane Iniki caused several million dollars in property damage, and two deaths on Oahu.

High swells affected the southwestern coasts of Maui and the Big Island, which damaged boats, harbors, and coastal structures. The high waves damaged 12 homes on the Big Island. In Honokōhau Harbor, three or four sailboats were tossed onto the rocks and one trimaran at another harbor was sunk. A beach near Napoʻopoʻo on Kealakekua Bay lost some sand and to this day has never been the same.

Aftermath

Immediately after the storm, many were relieved to have survived the worst of the Category 4 hurricane; their complacency turned to apprehensiveness due to lack of information, as every radio station was out and there was no news available for several days. Because Iniki knocked out electrical power for most of the island, communities held parties to necessarily consume perishable food from unpowered refrigerators and freezers and many hotels prepared and hosted free meals to use up their perishables. Though some food markets allowed those affected to take what they needed, many Kauai citizens insisted on paying. In addition, entertainers from all of Hawaii, including Graham Nash (who owns a home on the north shore of Kauaʻi) and the Honolulu Symphony, provided free concerts to the victims.

Three days after Iniki struck Hawaii, the NOAA Assistant Administrator for Weather Services directed that a disaster survey team investigate the warnings and responsiveness to the hurricane.

The film Jurassic Park was being filmed at the time; the sets used for the deleted scene where Mr. Arnold goes to the shed to turn the power on were destroyed, and the cast and crew took shelter in a hotel. Shots of Iniki made it in to the final film. Looting occurred in the aftermath of Iniki, though it was very minor. A group of Army Corps of Engineers, who experienced the looting of Hurricane Andrew just weeks before, were surprised at the overall calmness and lack of violence on the island. Although electrical power was restored to most of the island approximately six weeks following the hurricane, students returned to Kauaʻi public schools two weeks after the disaster. Kauai citizens remained hopeful for monetary aid from the government or insurance companies, though after six months they felt annoyed with the lack of help. The military effectively provided aid for their immediate needs including prepared meals and passing out MREs (meals ready to eat), though, and help arrived before local officials requested aid.

By four weeks after the hurricane, only 20% of power was restored on Kauai, following the island-wide blackout. Amateur radio proved to be extremely helpful during the three weeks after the storm, with volunteers coming from the neighboring islands as well as from around the Pacific to assist in the recovery. There was support of local government communications in Lihue in the first week of recovery  as well as a hastily organized effort by local operators to assist with the American Red Cross and their efforts to provide shelters and disaster relief centers across Kauaʻi.

In the months after the storm, many insurance companies left Hawaii. To combat this, State Governor John D. Waihee III enacted the Hurricane Relief Fund in 1993 to help unprotected Hawaii residents. The fund was never needed for another Hawaii hurricane, and it was stopped in 2000 when insurance companies returned to the island.

It is thought that Hurricane Iniki blew apart many chicken coops, some possibly used to house fighting chickens; this caused a dramatic increase in the numbers of feral chickens roaming Kauai.

The name Iniki was retired due to this storm's impacts, and was replaced with Iolana in the Central North Pacific tropical storm list.

The passages of Iwa and Iniki within a ten-year period increased public awareness of hurricanes in Hawaii.

In popular culture
The events and survivor accounts of the hurricane were featured in an episode of The Weather Channel docuseries Storm Stories titled "Iniki Jurassic", the 6th episode of the GRB Entertainment docuseries Earth's Fury (also known as Anatomy of Disaster outside the United States) titled "Hurricane Force", the 2008 4th episode of the Discovery Channel reality television series Destroyed in Seconds, the 1996 Fox television special When Disasters Strike, and the 1999 11th episode of the reality television series World's Most Amazing Videos.

The archival footage of the hurricane is shown on the 2004 film The Day After Tomorrow, in a scene that is set in New York City.

See also

 Tropical cyclones in 1992
 List of Category 4 Pacific hurricanes
 List of Hawai'i hurricanes
 List of Pacific hurricanes
 List of retired Pacific hurricane names
 Typhoon Higos (2002) – a storm that took a very similar trajectory to that of Iniki, albeit thousands of miles west of Hawaii, becoming one of the strongest typhoons to strike Tokyo
 Hurricane Lane (2018) – another powerful storm that threatened to strike Hawaii as a strong hurricane, but instead turned westward out to sea, bringing record amounts of rainfall to the islands
 Hurricane Walaka (2018) – took a similar track, making a 90° northward turn under the influence of an upper level trough, but stayed to the west of the main Hawaiian islands

References

External links

 Central Pacific Hurricane Center: Hurricane Iniki
 NHC 18-E archive

1992 Pacific hurricane season
Category 4 Pacific hurricanes
Hurricanes in Hawaii
Retired Pacific hurricanes
1992 natural disasters in the United States
1992 in Hawaii